Fønss is a Danish surname. Notable people with the surname include:

Anders Fønss
Olaf Fønss (1882–1949), Danish actor, director, producer, and film censor, brother of Aage Fønss
Aage Fønss (1887–1976), Danish operatic singer
 

Danish-language surnames